Rams Head Live! is an indoor music venue, club, and bar located in Baltimore, Maryland, United States. Located in the Power Plant Live! district of downtown Baltimore, the venue is surrounded by several other bars and clubs. Rams Head Live! opened on December 15, 2004. The venue features  of floor space with five bars and three different viewing levels of the stage.

All Time Low became the first band to sell out the venue during their short summer tour in mid-July 2008. In an interview with Pitchfork, Queens of the Stone Age frontman Josh Homme named the venue as one of his "favorite new venues," saying that "they treated us really good and it was really cool." In 2016, Consequence of Sound ranked Rams Head Live! at #91 on its list of "The 100 Greatest American Music Venues."

References

External links
Rams Head Live!

Inner Harbor, Baltimore
Music venues in Baltimore
Tourist attractions in Baltimore
2004 establishments in Maryland